Scuol-Tarasp railway station is the northern terminus of the Bever–Scuol-Tarasp railway. It is located on the western edge of the village of Scuol at an altitude of 1287 m in the Lower Engadine. The station is named after the neighbouring village of Scuol and the small town of Tarasp.

Scuol-Tarasp station was completely rebuilt and renovated in 2009. Since then, a Postbus stop has been located on the right side of the station building; this is the starting point for Postbus routes in the Lower Engadine. In addition, an island platform was built with platform track 1 as a dead-end track and track 2 as a through track. This allows direct access to the trains and platform at ground level. Platform 1 is the only platform in use for passenger services. Likewise, the freight handling facilities were renewed and rebuilt.

Scuol-Tarasp is the terminus or starting point for the Scuol-Tarasp–Zernez–Samedan–Pontresina regional service and for the Scuol-Tarasp–Landquart–Chur–Disentis Regional-Express service, both running hourly. Regular bus routes to Ftan, Tarasp, Samnaun, Martina, Sent, S-charl and Val Sinestra start at the station. In addition, the local school bus stops at the station. The cable car to Motta Naluns begins next to the station. Every week, up to five freight trains run daily from Landquart to Scuol-Tarasp. Oil, mail, cement and garbage are the main freight handled at the station.

Services
The following services stop at Scuol-Tarasp:

 RegioExpress: hourly service to Disentis/Mustér.

References

External links
 
 

Railway stations in Graubünden
Rhaetian Railway stations
Scuol
Railway stations in Switzerland opened in 1913